Cristian Florin Ianu (born 16 October 1983 in Timișoara) is a Romanian footballer.

Club career
In 2003, he went to Switzerland to join AC Bellinzona, along with former UT Arad teammate Adrian Piţ, leaving four years later to join FC Aarau at Swiss Super League, where he is contracted until June 2009.

On 10 May 2009 FC Luzern announced that they had signed the Romanian forward from FC Aarau on a contract until 2012. Ianu moved to FC Lucerne in July 2009.

Ianu scored 21 goals in his first season with FC Luzern. He was voted the 'player of the season' by the club' supporters. Despite his strong performances and media calls for his debut in the national team, he has so far been ignored by Romania national team manager Răzvan Lucescu.

Ianu was also voted the player of the year in an online fans poll by JustCantBeatThat.com, FCL's fansite in English. Ianu was presented with the award at a pre-season friendly against FC St Gallen.

Ianu suffered a serious leg injury in Luzern's 4–1 victory away at FC Basel which has ruled him out of much of the 2010-11 campaign.

In 2012, he was transferred to FC Sion until June 2014, scoring 2 goals in this season.

In 2012/2013 season he was on loan to Wohlen where scored 10 goals.

In 2013/2014 season, after the loan period, he returned to FC Sion in Swiss Super League.

In 2014, he was transferred to Lausanne-Sport.

International
In 2001, he played for the Romanian U19 team at the UEFA European Under-19 Football Championship in Finland.

Honours

References

External links
 
 Statistics at T-Online.de 
 
 Hattrick.com profile 
 football.ch profile 

1983 births
Living people
Sportspeople from Timișoara
Romanian footballers
Association football forwards
FC UTA Arad players
AC Bellinzona players
FC Aarau players
FC Luzern players
FC Sion players
FC Wohlen players
FC Lausanne-Sport players
FC Schaffhausen players
Liga I players
Swiss Super League players
Swiss Challenge League players
Romanian expatriate footballers
Expatriate footballers in Switzerland
Romanian expatriate sportspeople in Switzerland